In mathematics, value may refer to several, strongly related notions.

In general, a mathematical value may be any definite mathematical object.

 The value of a variable or a constant is any number or other mathematical object assigned to it.
 The value of a mathematical expression is the result of the computation  described by this expression when the variables and constants in it are assigned values.
 The value of a function, given the value(s) assigned to its argument(s), is the quantity assumed by the function for these argument values.

If the variable, expression or function only assumes real values, it is called real-valued. Likewise, a complex-valued variable, expression or function only assumes complex values.

See also 

 Value function
 Value (computer science)
 Absolute value
 Truth value

References

Elementary mathematics

nl:Reëel-waardige functie